Kenneth Ronald Craigie (15 April 1924 – 8 November 2003), better known as Ken Craigie, was an English international table tennis player.

Table tennis career
Craigie won a bronze medal at the 1954 World Table Tennis Championships in the Swaythling Cup (men's team) event with Richard Bergmann, Johnny Leach, Aubrey Simons and Harry Venner for England.

He coached the twin sisters Diane Rowe and Rosalind Rowe at the West Ealing Table Tennis Club.

Personal life and death
Craigie was born in Lambeth, London on 15 April 1924. He died after a long illness in Richmond, Surrey on 8 November 2003, at the age of 79.

See also
 List of England players at the World Team Table Tennis Championships
 List of World Table Tennis Championships medalists

References

1924 births
2003 deaths
English male table tennis players
World Table Tennis Championships medalists